In linguistic morphology, fossilization refers to two close notions. One is preserving of ancient linguistic features which have lost their grammatical functions in language. Another is loss of productivity of a grammatical paradigm (e.g. of an affix), which still remains in use in some words.

Examples of fossilization include fossilized morphemes and fossil words.

The term fossilization or interlanguage fossilization is also used in reference to the observation that most adult second language learners never reach a native-language learners' level of proficiency. These Second language learner routinely suffer from errors that can be categorized into four distinctive categories, phonological fossilization, lexical fossilization, syntactic fossilization and pragmatic fossilization. These errors occur regardless of exposure to the language or education level.

References

Linguistic morphology